What a Widow! was a 1930 American pre-Code romantic comedy film directed by Allan Dwan and produced by and starring Gloria Swanson. It was distributed through United Artists.

The film was produced by Joseph P. Kennedy, Sr. It received generally positive reviews and was noted for its animated title sequence created by William Dietz, but was met with lukewarm returns at the box office.

Cast
Gloria Swanson as Tamarind Brook
Owen Moore as Gerry Morgan
Lew Cody as Victor
Margaret Livingston as Valli
William Holden as Mr. Lodge
Herbert Braggiotti as Jose Alvarado
Gregory Gaye as Baslikoff
Adrienne D'Ambricourt as Paulette
Nella Walker as Marquise
Daphne Pollard as Masseuse
Reginald Sharland (uncredited)

Preservation status
This film is now considered a lost film. The soundtrack is preserved at the UCLA Film and Television Archive, and the trailer is preserved at the Library of Congress.

See also
List of lost films

References

External links

Stills at Glorious Gloria Swanson website
Still at gettyimages.com

1930 films
1930 romantic comedy films
American romantic comedy films
American black-and-white films
Films directed by Allan Dwan
American independent films
Lost American films
United Artists films
1930 lost films
1930s American films